This timeline is a chronology of significant events in the history of the U.S. State of New Mexico and the historical area that is now occupied by the state.


2020s

2010s

2000s

1990s

1980s

1970s

1960s

1950s

1940s

1930s

1920s

1910s

1900s

1890s

1880s

1870s

1860s

1850s

1840s

1830s

1820s

1810s

1800s

1790s

1780s

1770s

1760s

1750s

1740s

1730s

1720s

1710s

1700s

1690s

1680s

1670s

1660s

1650s

1640s

1630s

1620s

1610s

1600s

1590s

1540s

1530s

1510s

1490s

Before 1492

See also

Government of New Mexico
List of governors of New Mexico
List of Mexican governors of New Mexico
List of Spanish governors of New Mexico
History of New Mexico
History of slavery in New Mexico
List of counties in New Mexico
List of ghost towns in New Mexico
List of municipalities in New Mexico
Index of New Mexico-related articles
Indigenous peoples of the North American Southwest
Outline of New Mexico
Southwestern archaeology
Territorial evolution of New Mexico
Santa Fe de Nuevo México
U.S. provisional government of New Mexico
Territory of New Mexico
State of New Mexico
Timeline of New Mexico history
Timeline of Albuquerque, New Mexico

References
References are included in the linked articles.

External links

State of New Mexico website
New Mexico History Museum website
 Timeline

Timeline of New Mexico history
Timeline of New Mexico history
Timelines of states of the United States
United States history timelines